Crocus alatavicus  is a species of flowering plant in the genus Crocus of the family Iridaceae. It is a cormous perennial native to Kazakhstan, Kyrgyzstan, Tajikistan, Uzbekistan, and Xinjiang.

Description
Crocus alatavicus is a herbaceous perennial geophyte growing from a corm. The medium-sized corm  has a tunic with parallel fibers. The narrow leaves number 8 to 20 and are short  during flowering. The white flowers have gray to black-violet spotting on the outside surfaces. The flower throats are yellow and so are the anthers. The stigma is yellow to orange.

Crocus alatavicus is found growing in the mountains among stones and in scrub, often in association with Colchicum luteum; flowering occurs in February to May depending on the altitude.

Plants are easy to grow in a bulb frame if the soil remains dry during summer. It is winter hardy to USDA zone 4.

References

alatavicus
Flora of Asia